Dabbaghi (Persian: دباغی) is a Persian surname that may refer to the following notable people:
Abbas Dabbaghi (born 1987), Iranian freestyle wrestler 
Hajar Dabbaghi (born 1999), Iranian football forward

Persian-language surnames